Shangaly is the name of several rural localities in Ustyansky District of Arkhangelsk Oblast, Russia:
Shangaly, Ilezsky Selsoviet, Ustyansky District, Arkhangelsk Oblast, a station in Ilezsky Selsoviet
Shangaly, Shangalsky Selsoviet, Ustyansky District, Arkhangelsk Oblast, a selo in Shangalsky Selsoviet